The Haskard Highlands are a range of peaks and ridges between Blaiklock Glacier and Stratton Glacier in the northwest of the Shackleton Range, Antarctica, rising to  at Mount Weston and including features between Mount Provender and Pointer Nunatak. The highlands were first mapped in 1957 by the Commonwealth Trans-Antarctic Expedition, and photographed from the air by the U.S. Navy in 1967. They were surveyed by the British Antarctic Survey between 1968 and 1971, and named by the UK Antarctic Place-Names Committee in 1971 after Sir Cosmo Haskard, Governor of the Falkland Islands 1964–70.

References

Mountains of Coats Land
Highlands